Mark William Gross  (30 November 1965) is an American mathematician, specializing in differential geometry, algebraic geometry, and mirror symmetry.

Education
Gross studied from 1982 at Cornell University graduating with a bachelor's degree in 1984 and received in 1990 a PhD from the University of California, Berkeley for research supervised by Robin Hartshorne with a thesis on the Surfaces in the Four-Dimensional Grassmannian.

Career
From 1990 to 1993 he was an assistant professor at the University of Michigan and spent the academic year 1992–1993 on leave as a postdoctoral researcher at the Mathematical Sciences Research Institute (MSRI) in Berkeley. He was at Cornell University in 1993–1997 an assistant professor and in 1997–2001 an associate professor and then at University of California, San Diego in 2001–2013 a full professor. He was a visiting professor at the University of Warwick in the academic year 2002–2003. Since 2013, he has been a professor at the University of Cambridge and since 2016, a Fellow of King's College, Cambridge.

Research
Gross works on complex geometry, algebraic geometry, and mirror symmetry.  Gross and Bernd Siebert jointly developed a program (known as the Gross–Siebert Program) for studying mirror symmetry within algebraic geometry.

Selected publications

Topological Mirror Symmetry, Inventiones Mathematicae, vol. 144, 2001, pp. 75–137,   
with D. Joyce, D. Huybrechts (eds.), Calabi–Yau Manifolds and related Geometries (Nordfjordeid 2001), Springer ; 2012 reprint 
with B. Siebert: From real affine geometry to complex geometry, Annals of Mathematics, vol. 174, 2011, pp. 1301–1428,  
with Paul S. Aspinwall, Tom Bridgeland, Alastair Craw, Michael R. Douglas, Anton Kapustin, Gregory W. Moore, Graeme Segal, Balázs Szendrői, and P. M. H. Wilson: Dirichlet branes and Mirror Symmetry, Clay Mathematics Monographs 4, 2009
Tropical geometry and mirror symmetry, CBMS Regional conference series in Mathematics 114, AMS, 2011 
The Strominger–Yau–Zaslow conjecture: From torus fibrations to degenerations, AMS Symposium Algebraic Geometry, Seattle 2005, Preprint 2008,  
Mirror Symmetry and the Strominger–Yau–Zaslow conjecture, Current Developments in Mathematics 2012,

Awards and honors
Gross was an Invited Speaker, jointly with Siebert, with talk Local mirror symmetry in the tropics at the International Congress of Mathematicians in Seoul 2014. In 2016 Gross and Siebert jointly received the Clay Research Award. Gross was elected a Fellow of the Royal Society in 2017.

References

1965 births
Living people
20th-century American mathematicians
21st-century American mathematicians
Differential geometers
Algebraic geometers
Cornell University alumni
University of California, Berkeley alumni
Cornell University faculty
University of California, San Diego faculty
Academics of the University of Cambridge
Fellows of the Royal Society
Fellows of King's College, Cambridge
University of Michigan faculty